Tarallo is a surname. Notable people with the surname include:

Luís Tarallo (born 1966), Brazilian basketball coach
Maria Grazia Tarallo (1866–1912), Italian Roman Catholic nun
Michele Tarallo (born 1980), Italian footballer
Stefano Tarallo (born 1976), Italian tennis player

See also
Taralli